A list of films produced by the Marathi language film industry based in Maharashtra in the year 1951.

1951 Releases
A list of Marathi films released in 1951.

References

External links
Gomolo - 

Lists of 1951 films by country or language
 Marathi
1951